Fairfield Halt was a railway station at Fairfield near Buxton, Derbyshire that was open between 1907 and 1939. The station was opened by the London & North Western Railway (LNWR) on 16 December 1907 to serve the nearby Buxton Golf Club.  Opening the station had been requested by the golf club committee and the local authority to attract more visitors who lived close to the LNWR's line between Manchester and Buxton.

In addition passengers were only allowed to alight from trains.

Known at various times as simply Fairfield, Fairfield Halt and Fairfield Halt for Golf Links, the station closed at the outbreak of the Second World War.

References

Former London and North Western Railway stations
Railway stations in Great Britain opened in 1907
Railway stations in Great Britain closed in 1939
Disused railway stations in Derbyshire